The following is a list of recurring Saturday Night Live characters and sketches introduced between October 6, 1984, and April 13, 1985, the tenth season of SNL.

Ed Grimley

Martin Short played a hyperactive nerd.  Ed originally appeared as a recurring character in the Canadian series, SCTV. Debuted on SNL October 6, 1984.

Appearances

Rich Hall's Election Report
A Rich Hall sketch.

Appearances

Lawrence Orbach
A Martin Short character, Lawrence was awkward and child-like. Lawrence also originally appeared in the Canadian series SCTV, as a contestant in the game show parody "Half-Wits".  Debuted on SNL October 6, 1984.

Lew Goldman
Goldman was a stereotypical elderly Jewish man played by Billy Crystal. He was prone to commenting on his disrespectful family while doing various commentaries. He also coughed and cleared his throat frequently, due to an apparent excess of phlegm. One of his most memorable insults was: "I have coughed up things that were more interesting than you!" Debuted October 13, 1984.

Tippi Turtle
A Christopher Guest animated short. Debuted October 13, 1984.

Appearances

Willie & Frankie ("Don't ya hate it when...?")
A Billy Crystal and Christopher Guest sketch. Two good friends have meandering discussions in a variety of settings that inevitably drift into detailed anecdotes of grotesquely painful self-abuse.  The men each complete the other's statements, correctly assuming increasingly outlandish scenarios. The characters periodically made some version of the remark "Don't ya hate it when that happens?" as though the pain they inflicted on themselves was a matter of bad luck. Debuted October 20, 1984.

Appearances

Buddy Young, Jr.
Buddy Young, Jr. was a Las Vegas lounge comedian played by Billy Crystal. This is a rare example of a little-known character spinning off into a feature film.  Although Buddy Young, Jr. appeared only four times on SNL, he was the principal character in the 1992 film, Mr. Saturday Night. Debuted October 20, 1984.

Fernando's Hideaway
Billy Crystal played a parody of Fernando Lamas as the character Fernando, who would interview various celebrities, often confusing them with someone else (e.g. confusing actor Johnny Yune for football player Johnny Unitas). During each interview he would say, "You look mahvelous", and frequently the sketch would end with, "It's better to look good than to feel good." Debuted November 3, 1984.

Appearances

The Joe Franklin Show
A parody of The Joe Franklin Show, with Billy Crystal impersonating host Joe Franklin. Debuted November 10, 1984.

Appearances

Jackie Rogers Jr.
A Martin Short character. Debuted November 10, 1984.

Chi Chi & Consuela
A Mary Gross and Julia Louis-Dreyfus sketch. Debuted November 10, 1984.

Appearances

Nathan Thurm
A shady lawyer, Thurm was a chain-smoker (often letting his cigarette burn to the point of becoming mostly ashes), quite paranoid, and constantly in denial about his paranoia. "I'm not being defensive. You're the one who's being defensive." When questioned, his response often included, "It's so funny to me that you would think..." He would break the fourth wall, looking into the camera and expressing his puzzlement at the questioner by asking, "Is it me, or is it him? It's him, right?" Other times, he would deny an accusation, then immediately reverse his position when the accuser reaffirmed the statement. "No, it isn't!" ("Yes it is.") "I know that! Why wouldn't I know that? I'm well aware of that!" Debuted November 17, 1984, and played by Martin Short.

Perhaps the best known appearance of Thurm was in a 1984 SNL sketch that was a send-up of 60 Minutes. Harry Shearer played Mike Wallace, accusing Thurm of being involved in corporate corruption. Thurm of course denied everything and nervously tried to turn the tables on Wallace.

Thurm was later reprised in 1990's The Earth Day Special as well as on Martin Short's short-lived talk show in 1999–2000.
 
In his book I Must Say: My Life As A Humble Comedy Legend, Short revealed that the character was based on a makeup artist who worked at SNL.

Appearances

Paul Harvey
Rich Hall impersonates Paul Harvey on Saturday Night News.
Appearances

Strictly From Blackwell
A Harry Shearer sketch. Debuted December 8, 1984.

Ricky & Phil
A Billy Crystal and Christopher Guest sketch. Debuted January 19, 1985.

That White Guy
A James Belushi sketch. Debuted February 2, 1985.

Appearances

Robert Latta
A Rich Hall sketch based on a man who was caught trespassing at the White House in 1985. Debuted February 2, 1985.

Appearances

References

Lists of recurring Saturday Night Live characters and sketches
Saturday Night Live
Saturday Night Live
Saturday Night Live in the 1980s